International Accounting Standard 7: Statement of Cash Flows or IAS 7 is an accounting standard that establishes standards for cash flow reporting used in International Financial Reporting Standards.

A statement of cash flows for the periods, is an integral "Component of financial statements" as per IAS 1 — Presentation of Financial Statements.

History of IAS 7

IAS 7 was reissued in December 1992, retitled in September 2007, and is operative for financial statements covering periods beginning on or after 1 January 1994.

References

External links 
 IASB (International Accounting Standards Board)

IAS 07
Cash flow